The fastest times in the swimming events at the South Asian Games are designated as the South Asian Games records in swimming. The events are held in a long course (50 m) pool. All records were set in finals unless noted otherwise.

Men

Women

References

External links

South Asian Games
Records
Swimming